is a private university in Minoh, Osaka, Japan, established in 2005.

External links
 Official website 

Educational institutions established in 2005
Private universities and colleges in Japan
Universities and colleges in Osaka Prefecture
2005 establishments in Japan